Finn McCools Fingers (or "Shantemon Stone Row") are a set of five standing stones on Shantemon mountain in County Cavan. The name is derived from the story that giant Celtic warrior Fionn mac Cumhaill lost a hand in battle. The stones are arranged in a south-east/north-west orientation.

References

Fenian Cycle
Tourist attractions in County Cavan
Mountains and hills of County Cavan
Monuments and memorials in the Republic of Ireland
Megalithic monuments in Ireland